Fort Davis High School is a public high school located in the unincorporated community of Fort Davis, in central Jeff Davis County, Texas, United States.  The school is operated by the Fort Davis Independent School District and classified as a 1A school by the UIL.   In 2013, the school was rated "Improvement Required" by the Texas Education Agency.

Segregated schools
Fort Davis, like other Texas communities, formerly had racially segregated schools, with the "White" school on the site of the present-day Fort Davis High School. The "Mexican school" was located at the current site of Dirks-Anderson Elementary School in Fort Davis.

Athletics

The Fort Davis Indians compete in the following sports 

Cross Country, Volleyball, 6-Man Football, Basketball, Golf, Tennis, Track & Baseball

State Titles
Volleyball 
1980(1A)

References

External links
Fort Davis ISD
List of Six-man football stadiums in Texas

Schools in Jeff Davis County, Texas
Public high schools in Texas
Public middle schools in Texas